"One Time Around" is a single by Canadian country music artist Michelle Wright. Released in 1992, it was the second single from her album Now and Then. It reached #1 on the RPM Country Tracks chart in October 1992.

Chart performance

Year-end charts

References

1992 singles
Michelle Wright songs
Arista Nashville singles
Songs written by Don Pfrimmer
Songs written by Chapin Hartford
1992 songs